Pazos is a surname. Notable people with the surname include:

Anthony Pazos, American television personality, celebrity stylist, and entrepreneur
Felipe Pazos (1912–2001), Cuban economist 
James Pazos (born 1991), American baseball player
Luis Pazos (born 1947), Mexican economist
Manuel Pazos (1930–2019), Spanish footballer
Marcelo Pazos (born 1953), Argentine field hockey player
Rubén Pazos (born 1979), Spanish footballer